= Unige =

UNIGE or UniGe may refer to:

- University of Geneva (UNIGE), Switzerland
- University of Genoa (UniGe), Italy
